Bêche-de-mer can refer to:
 Bislama, a creole language or Pidgin English spoken in Vanuatu
 Sea cucumber (food)